Konary may refer to:
the battle of Konary
Konary, Konin County in Greater Poland Voivodeship (west-central Poland)
Konary, Rawicz County in Greater Poland Voivodeship (west-central Poland)
Konary, Wągrowiec County in Greater Poland Voivodeship (west-central Poland)
Konary, Strzelin County in Lower Silesian Voivodeship (south-west Poland)
Konary, Środa Śląska County in Lower Silesian Voivodeship (south-west Poland)
Konary, Wołów County in Lower Silesian Voivodeship (south-west Poland)
Konary, Inowrocław County in Kuyavian-Pomeranian Voivodeship (north-central Poland)
Konary, Radziejów County in Kuyavian-Pomeranian Voivodeship (north-central Poland)
Konary, Kutno County in Łódź Voivodeship (central Poland)
Konary, Zgierz County in Łódź Voivodeship (central Poland)
Konary, Lesser Poland Voivodeship (south Poland)
Konary, Busko County in Świętokrzyskie Voivodeship (south-central Poland)
Konary, Jędrzejów County in Świętokrzyskie Voivodeship (south-central Poland)
Konary, Sandomierz County in Świętokrzyskie Voivodeship (south-central Poland)
Konary, Grójec County in Masovian Voivodeship (east-central Poland)
Konary, Nowy Dwór Mazowiecki County in Masovian Voivodeship (east-central Poland)
Konary, Płock County in Masovian Voivodeship (east-central Poland)
Konary, Przysucha County in Masovian Voivodeship (east-central Poland)
Konary, Sochaczew County in Masovian Voivodeship (east-central Poland)
Konary, Silesian Voivodeship (south Poland)